Burlington South is a station on NJ Transit's River Line light rail system, located on West Broad Street in Burlington, Burlington County, New Jersey, United States, near the New Jersey side of the Burlington–Bristol Bridge.

The station opened on March 15, 2004. Southbound service from the station is available to Camden, New Jersey. Northbound service is available to the Trenton Transit Center with connections to NJ Transit trains to New York City, SEPTA trains to Philadelphia, and Amtrak trains. Transfer to the PATCO Speedline is available at the Walter Rand Transportation Center.

Park and ride service is available at this station, which is near the southeastern plaza of the Burlington–Bristol Bridge. The station contains a pair of non-functioning railroad signals and a sign on the evolution of grade crossing signs in front of a bicycle rack. A similar display can be found at Riverton further to the southwest.

References

External links

 Station from Google Maps Street View

2004 establishments in New Jersey
Burlington, New Jersey
River Line stations
Railway stations in Burlington County, New Jersey
Railway stations in the United States opened in 2004